The Pilesgrove Solar Farm is a 20-megawatt (MW, 26,800 hp) solar photovoltaic power plant, located in Pilesgrove Township, New Jersey. The farm contains 71,000 ground-mounted solar panels and at the time of its construction was one of the largest solar farms in the northeast United States.

The solar farm was developed by Dallas-based Panda Power Funds and Valhalla, New York-based Con Edison Development. In addition to the sale of electrical power, the companies are expected to generate an additional $11 million to $12 million per year in renewable energy certificates.

See also

Solar power in New Jersey
List of power stations in New Jersey

References 

Photovoltaic power stations in New Jersey
Energy infrastructure completed in 2011
Buildings and structures in Salem County, New Jersey
Pilesgrove Township, New Jersey